Oscar Peterson and Dizzy Gillespie is an album by Oscar Peterson and Dizzy Gillespie that was released in 1974. At the Grammy Awards of 1976, Gillespie won the Grammy Award for Best Jazz Performance by a Soloist for his performance on this album.

Track listing
 "Caravan" (Duke Ellington, Irving Mills, Juan Tizol) – 7:02
 "Mozambique" (Dizzy Gillespie, Oscar Peterson) – 7:08
 "Autumn Leaves" (Joseph Kosma, Johnny Mercer, Jacques Prévert) – 7:25
 "Close Your Eyes" (Bernice Petkere) – 5:26
 "Blues for Bird" (Gillespie, Peterson) – 12:32
 "Dizzy Atmosphere" (Gillespie) – 4:55
 "Alone Together" (Howard Dietz, Arthur Schwartz) – 5:16
 "Con Alma" (Gillespie) – 5:15

Personnel
 Oscar Peterson – piano
 Dizzy Gillespie – trumpet

References 

1974 albums
Oscar Peterson albums
Dizzy Gillespie albums
Pablo Records albums
Albums produced by Norman Granz